Madeleine Joan Blaustein (formerly Adam Blaustein, October 9, 1960 – December 11, 2008), also known as Kendra Bancroft, was an American voice actress and comic writer who was known for her voice acting work for 4Kids Entertainment, DuArt Film and Video and NYAV Post, for her reprising role as the character Meowth from the Pokémon anime series and for comics written for Milestone Comics, in which she introduced one of superhero comics' first transgender female characters. She was the first intersex and transgender voice artist for many of her respective agencies.

Career
In the late 1980s, Blaustein worked for Marvel Comics, as an editor (several issues each of Web of Spider-Man, Marvel Tales, and Marvel Saga) as a writer (several issues of Conan the King), and penciling a one-shot of Power Pachyderms. She wrote assorted comics published by DC Comics in the early 1990s, including a few for the Impact Comics imprint and TSR line.

In 1994 she went to work for Milestone Media as production manager and writer. With assistance from her partner Yves Fezzani – sometimes billed together as "Adam & Yves" – she wrote issues of flagship titles Hardware and Static (in which she co-created the character Rubber-Band Man). She also wrote (with Fezzani) Milestone's first limited series Deathwish, which featured as its central character transgender female police officer Marisa Rahm, one of the first trans heroes featured in mainstream superhero comics. During this time she was sometimes referred to in editorial copy in the comics as "Addie Blaustein".

After leaving Milestone, she served as Creative Director for Weekly World News.

Blaustein was a voice actress at 4Kids Entertainment, where she worked on the English dub version of the Pokémon anime. She provided "filler" voices for various characters until episode #31, when she took over from Nathan Price in the role of Meowth, which she played through season 8. During the 2004 Democratic Party primaries, she voiced Sméagol on the Mike Malloy Show, announcing a satirical presidential bid.

Beginning in 2004 under the pseudonym Kendra Bancroft, Blaustein was a content creator on the Second Life platform, earning a reputation as an innovative, competent, and reliable 3-D modeller in the communities where she participated.

Personal life
Blaustein was born the second oldest of five children in Long Island, New York. She was intersex, and was assigned male at birth before transitioning to female. Her experience as an activist in the transgender community helped her to organize and support groups of people in Second Life.

Video game localization coordinator and translator Jeremy Blaustein is her brother.

Death
Blaustein died on December 11, 2008, at age 48 in Christ Hospital of Jersey City, New Jersey from an untreated stomach virus (possibly gastroenteritis) that she had been suffering from a couple of weeks prior. She is buried at the Congregation B'nai Israel Cemetery in Northampton, Hampshire County, Massachusetts.

Work

Voice roles
 Cutie Honey (live action movie) – Sister Jill
 Cubix – Dr. K
 Dinosaur King – Helga (Season 1)
 One Piece - Dr.Kureha (4kids Dub)
 Domain of Murder – Detective Shimizu
 Funky Cops - Additional voices
 G.I. Joe: Sigma 6 - Overkill
 Garfield's Fun Fest - Alligators
 Huntik: Secrets & Seekers – Rassimov (Ep. "Mission"; Posthumous release) 
 Impy's Island – Shoe the Shoebill
 Impy's Wonderland – Shoe the Shoebill
 Jungle Emperor Leo - Mother, Trainer
Kirby: Right Back at Ya! - Chef Kawasaki, Waddle Doo, Professor Curio, Tuggle, Gengu, Melman, Biblio 
 Mutant Rampage Bodyslam – L. Wolf Jam
 Pokémon – Meowth (episodes 32-416), additional voices
 Pokémon Chronicles – Meowth
 Pokémon: The First Movie – Meowth
 Pokémon: The Movie 2000 – Meowth
 Pokémon 3: The Movie – Meowth
 Pokémon: Mewtwo Returns – Meowth
 Pokémon 4Ever – Meowth
 Pokémon Heroes – Meowth
 Pokémon: Jirachi Wish Maker – Meowth
 Pokémon: Destiny Deoxys – Meowth
 Pokémon: Lucario and the Mystery of Mew – Meowth
 Samurai Deeper Kyo – Migeira
 Yu-Gi-Oh! Duel Monsters - Solomon Muto 
 Yu-Gi-Oh! GX - Sartorius Kumar 
 Slayers Try – Jillas Jillos Jilles
 The Little Panda Fighter – Grizzlepuss
 Tiny Robots - Nev1
 Viva Piñata – Corinna
 Wild Cardz - King

Video games
 Pokémon Channel - Meowth
 Shadow the Hedgehog – President
 Sonic the Hedgehog - E-123 Omega
 Valkyrie Profile – Arngrim, Barbarossa, Lawfer, Lezard Valeth

Writing
Deathwish #1-4 (Milestone Comics, 4-issue miniseries, with Yves Fezzani)
Hardware #20-21, 24, 26-28, 33  (Milestone Comics, The Hunt for Deathwish with Yves Fezzani)
Static #30-34 (Milestone Comics, with Yves Fezzani)
Icon #18 (Milestone Comics)

Art
Power Pachyderms (pencils) – Marvel Comics (1989)

References

External links

Interview with Maddie Blaustein from Trans-Ponder
Maddie Blaustein at the English Voice Actor & Production Staff Database
Former Marvel editor Christopher Priest on Blaustein's time at Marvel Comics

1960 births
2008 deaths
American comics writers
American voice actresses
Female comics writers
Intersex women
Intersex rights in the United States
Intersex rights activists
Jewish American actresses
LGBT comics creators
LGBT Jews
LGBT people from New York (state)
American LGBT rights activists
People from Long Island
Transgender actresses
Transgender Jews
Transgender rights activists
20th-century American actresses
20th-century American people
20th-century American Jews
21st-century American Jews
American LGBT actors
21st-century American women
American transgender writers
20th-century American LGBT people